The Men's pole vault event  at the 2004 IAAF World Indoor Championships was held on March 6–7.

Medalists

Results

Qualification
Qualification: Qualification Performance 5.75 (Q) or at least 8 best performers advanced to the final.

Final

References
Results

Pole
Pole vault at the World Athletics Indoor Championships